The 2017–18 ISU Challenger Series took place from September to December 2017. It was the fourth season of a group of senior-level international figure skating competitions ranked below the Grand Prix series.

Events 
The 2017–18 series was composed of ten events.

Medal summary

Men

Ladies

Pairs

Ice dance

Medal standings

Challenger Series rankings
The ISU Challenger Series rankings were formed by combining the two highest final scores of each skater or duo.

Men

Ladies

Pairs

Ice dance

Top scores in Challenger Series

Men 

Best total score

Ladies 

Best total score

Pairs 

Best total score

Ice dance 

Best total score

References

External links 
 ISU Challenger Series at the International Skating Union

Challenger
2017